Otsego County is the name of two counties in the United States:

 Otsego County, Michigan 
 Otsego County, New York